PDK may refer to:

Politics 
 Democratic Party of Kosovo (Albanian: Partia Demokratike e Kosovës), a political party in Kosovo
 Kurdistan Democratic Party
 Party of Democratic Kampuchea
 Phi Delta Kappa, an organization for educators
 The Christians (Norway) (Norwegian: Partiet De Kristne), a political party in Norway

Places 
 DeKalb–Peachtree Airport, Atlanta, Georgia, US
 Pind Dadan Khan, Punjab, Pakistan

Technical 
 Porsche Doppelkupplungsgetriebe, Porsche's dual-clutch transmission
 Process design kit, files for semiconductor manufacture
 Polydiketoenamine, a polymer

Science 
 Phosphoinositide-dependent kinase
 Pyruvate dehydrogenase kinase

Arts 
 PDK (Namibian music group)